KVRH-FM (92.3 FM) is a radio station broadcasting a Hot Adult Contemporary format. Licensed to Salida, Colorado, United States, the station is currently owned by Three Eagles Communications of Colorado, LLC and features programming from ABC Radio. The station airs the American Top 40 with Ryan Seacrest every Saturday night, John Tesh weekday afternoons and Totally Awesome 80's with Kent Jones Sunday afternoons.

References

External links

VRH-FM